Benu is a three-Michelin star New American restaurant located in the SoMa district of downtown San Francisco opened in 2010 by chef Corey Lee, the former Chef de cuisine at the French Laundry. Benu made the list of The World's 50 Best Restaurants in 2019.

Restaurant 
Corey Lee was born in Seoul, South Korea and moved to the United States at age five. Prior to opening his restaurant, he was the head chef at The French Laundry, working for Thomas Keller at both The French Laundry and Per Se for a total of nine years.

At Benu, he serves a set tasting menu that features a wide variety of seafood and vegetables, a few meat courses, and some sweets. Lee draws from many different cuisines, including Korean and Cantonese. He states that “Benu is open to the influence of all different kinds of cultures. We have Asian influences, of course. We have Western influences. We have influences that are technique-driven. Some are flavor-driven. Some are ingredient-driven. But it accepts all those things and it defines the kind of food we serve.”

Master Sommelier Yoon Ha is the restaurant's beverage director. In addition to the tasting menu, Benu offers an optional beverage pairing that includes beer, wine, and sake. The restaurant is open for dinner Tuesday through Saturday.

Benu is housed on the ground floor of a historic building that dates the back to 1922–originally the headquarters of the San Francisco Newspaper Company. Crown Point Press, an art studio, gallery, and bookstore, now owns the building and resides directly above the restaurant.

In 2015, Phaidon published Benu–a collection of recipes and essays that explores the restaurant's food, influences, and collaborators–with forewords by Thomas Keller and David Chang, designed by Julia Hasting.

Awards and honors
 Benu currently holds the highest Michelin Guide rating possible: three stars.
 4 Stars, San Francisco Chronicle
 Five Diamond Award, AAA
 2017 Best Chef: West, James Beard Foundation
 2019 Outstanding Wine Program, James Beard Foundation
 Eater 38 Icon (Named one of America's 38 Essential Restaurants for five consecutive times)
 On the 2019 list of The World's 50 Best Restaurants
 The 40 Most Important Restaurants of the Decade, Esquire
 The Most Important Restaurants of the Decade, Food & Wine
 5 Stars, Forbes Travel Guide

Gallery

See also
 List of Michelin starred restaurants
 List of Michelin 3-star restaurants in the United States
 List of New American restaurants

References

External links
 

Restaurants in San Francisco
Michelin Guide starred restaurants in California
New American restaurants in California